Grant Murray Robertson (born 30 October 1971) is a New Zealand politician and member of the Labour Party who has served as the minister of finance since 2017 and served as the 19th deputy prime minister of New Zealand from 2020 to 2023. He has been the member of Parliament (MP) for  since . 

Robertson maintained and competed for several leadership positions during the party's stint in opposition following the end of the Fifth Labour Government. He was elected Labour's deputy leader in 2011 under leader David Shearer, and contested the leadership of the party in both 2013 and 2014. Subsequently, Robertson was named the party's finance spokesperson and was ranked third on Labour's party list. Prime Minister Jacinda Ardern appointed him to the finance portfolio in the Sixth Labour Government. As finance minister, Robertson has been prominent in the government's economic response to the COVID-19 pandemic in New Zealand.

Following the 2020 general election he was appointed the 19th Deputy Prime Minister by Prime Minister Ardern. Robertson assumed the role on 6 November, becoming the first openly gay deputy prime minister.

Early life
Robertson was born in Palmerston North, the youngest of three boys. His Presbyterian family lived in Hastings before settling in South Dunedin. His mother initially stayed at home before later becoming a teacher. His father was an accountant, who was imprisoned in 1991 for stealing around $120,000 from the law firm he worked for. He had a paper round as a boy and at 16 he got his first job at a New World supermarket in Dunedin in the fruit and vegetable department preparing fruit and vegetables for display and sale.

Robertson attended King's High School in Dunedin, where he was head boy. He then studied political studies at the University of Otago, graduating with a Bachelor of Arts with honours in 1995. His honours dissertation studied the restructuring of the New Zealand University Students' Association in the 1980s. Robertson served as President of the Otago University Students' Association in 1993 and as co-president of the New Zealand University Students' Association in 1996.

Professional life
Robertson joined the Ministry of Foreign Affairs and Trade in 1997 after leaving university. His overseas postings included the United Nations in New York. Robertson also managed the NZ Overseas Aid Programme to Samoa – a $7.7 million fund with projects in diverse areas such as basic education, healthcare, public sector capacity building, small business development and the empowerment of women. He left MFAT in 2001.

Robertson returned to New Zealand during the first term of the Fifth Labour Government to work as a ministerial advisor to minister for the environment Marian Hobbs and, later, prime minister Helen Clark. During his time in Clark's office, Robertson was rumoured to have the nickname "H3" during the 2005 general election, with "H1" and "H2" being Clark and her Chief of Staff Heather Simpson respectively.

After the 2005 election, Robertson left the Prime Minister's office to work as the Senior Research Marketing Manager for the University of Otago based at the Wellington School of Medicine.

Political career

Campaign for Wellington Central: 2008

In late 2006, sitting MP for Wellington Central Marian Hobbs announced that she would be retiring at the 2008 general election. Robertson was considered to be a front runner and was subsequently selected unopposed. Robertson ran a well-staffed campaign, based on local issues like the closure of the Crossways Community Centre and threats to the Public Service. He was also involved in the formation of a Wellington inner-city residents' association.

The Labour Party list for the 2008 general election ranked Robertson at number 46.

In the Wellington Central electorate, Robertson defeated National candidate Stephen Franks by 1,904 votes. Robertson's plurality, although far less than the 6,180 vote difference held by his predecessor from the previous election, reflected a large swing in party votes to the National Party from Labour in the electorate and Robertson's status as a non-incumbent candidate.

First term in Parliament: 2008–2011
Helen Clark's government was defeated at the 2008 election. Robertson was appointed as the opposition's spokesperson for State Services, and associate spokesperson for Arts, Culture and Heritage and Foreign Affairs by new Labour leader Phil Goff.

In May 2010 Robertson's Ethical Investment (Crown Financial Institutions) Bill was drawn from the member's ballot. According to Robertson, the Bill "sought to have clear and consistent criteria for ethical investment in the legislation that govern our major investment funds such as the Super Fund and ACC." Although the Bill gained support from MPs in the Green and Māori parties, the Bill was defeated at its first reading.

On 15 June 2010, Opposition Leader Phil Goff appointed Robertson to be Portfolio Spokesperson for Tertiary Education and the 20th-ranked Labour MP, the highest of the 2008 intake of Labour MPs to be promoted at that point. In the election year reshuffle, on 2 February 2011, Robertson was further promoted to the front bench to take the Health portfolio. Commenting on the promotion, Phil Goff said that Robertson has "made a very strong impact in a very short time" and that he "has a promising future ahead of him."

At the 2011 general election, Robertson re-contested Wellington Central against eleven other candidates. He was re-elected with 49.2 percent of the electorate vote, increasing his majority to 6,376 over National Party candidate Paul Foster-Bell. However, the National Government was returned.

Second term: 2011–2014

Following the election and Annette King's resignation as Labour deputy leader, Robertson was elected by the Labour caucus as the new deputy leader under David Shearer. In Shearer's shadow Cabinet, Robertson also served as Spokesperson for Employment, Skills and Training, and Arts, Culture and Heritage. Following Shearer's resignation from the leadership in 2013, Robertson contested the party-wide leadership election. Although Robertson achieved the plurality support from his colleagues in Caucus, David Cunliffe garnered more support from party members and affiliates to win the overall vote. Under Cunliffe's leadership, Robertson was the third-ranked Labour MP and held various portfolios including Spokesperson for Economic Development and Shadow Leader of the House.

Throughout 2014, Robertson was critical of National Party minister Judith Collins, after she was accused of having a conflict of interest in regards to her visiting the dairy products company Oravida in China. He repeatedly called for her to resign during the Oravida saga, and when Collins later released information to the media about One News journalist Katie Bradford, he reiterated his call for her to resign, claiming she had "lost all perspective".

Third term: 2014–2017
Robertson was re-elected in the Wellington Central electorate in the September 2014 general election. The Labour Party performed poorly and leader David Cunliffe immediately came under pressure to resign. He was seen by some in the party as taking insufficient blame for the defeat. The leading challengers for the leadership were Robertson and David Shearer. Media reports suggest that some of the Labour caucus were trying to get Cunliffe to resign so Robertson and Jacinda Ardern could replace the current leadership unopposed. On 26 September, the voting record in the previous leadership race of unions affiliated to Labour was released, showing Cunliffe had won very strong union support in the previous race, and highlighting the challenge for Robertson's bid.

On 28 September, after Cunliffe had signalled his intention to resign, Robertson put his name forward to run for the Labour Party leadership. Robertson pointed to Labour's poor performance in the election as leading him to run: "I couldn't stand by and see the party poll at 24 per cent and not do something now that David's triggered the contest. That's why I've put my name forward." He also argued that the Labour Party needed unity, and he would be a unifying figure, with the support of most of the Labour caucus. Because there were four candidates for the leadership, the Labour Party held a leadership election.

Robertson lost the leadership election to Andrew Little by a small margin, Little receiving 50.52 per cent of the vote to Robertson's 49.48 per cent after the votes from the other unsuccessful candidates had been reallocated. However Robertson once again won the support of most of the caucus, as well as a majority of the membership. After the results were announced, Robertson said he would not seek the Labour Party leadership again in the future.

In Andrew Little's shadow cabinet reshuffle of November 2014, Robertson received the finance portfolio, and was ranked number 3 on the Labour list.

As part of his finance portfolio, he was engaged in researching international economic policy, and was responsible for the Labour Party's "Future of Work Commission." His aims for the portfolio were to cut down on the number of policies, and "humanise" the policy.

Fourth term: 2017–2020
Following Labour's formation of a government with New Zealand First and the Greens, Robertson was elected as a Cabinet minister by the Labour Party caucus. He was given the key role of finance minister by Prime Minister Jacinda Ardern, along with the portfolios of minister for sport & recreation and associate minister for arts, culture & heritage.

On 27 June 2019, Robertson was appointed as Minister Responsible for the Earthquake Commission, succeeding Megan Woods.

As finance minister, Robertson has been a close confidant of Ardern. During the New Zealand government's COVID-19 response, Robertson would sometimes deputise for Ardern at her daily press conferences. Their close working relationship led some commentators to describe him as her "de facto political deputy," over Labour Party deputy leader Kelvin Davis.

Fifth term and deputy prime minister: 2020–present 

Robertson was re-elected for a fifth term as  MP at the 2020 general election, at which the Labour Party won an outright majority. Robertson retained Wellington Central by a margin of 18,878 votes.

In a cabinet reshuffle announced on 2 November, he was appointed to be the next Deputy Prime Minister of New Zealand. Robertson retained his portfolios as minister of finance and minister for sport & recreation, and added the ministerial portfolios for infrastructure and racing. The preceding deputy prime minister was New Zealand First leader Winston Peters, who had lost his seat in the recent election. Robertson became deputy prime minister after deputy party leader Kelvin Davis declined the position.

In mid-February 2021, Robertson pulled out of his weekly interview slots with Peter Williams' Magic Talk radio show after Williams questioned him about his views on the implications of the World Economic Forum's Great Reset for New Zealand. Robertson reportedly stated that he would no longer appear on the show since he did not want to "shoot down conspiracy theories."

In December 2022 commentator Morgan Godfery lauded his handling of the finance portfolio. 

Prime Minister Jacinda Ardern announced her resignation on 19 January 2023. Robertson immediately responded that he would not be seeking election as her successor but that he would contest the 2023 general election. Carmel Sepuloni replaced Robertson as Deputy Prime Minister.

Personal life
Robertson lives in Northland, Wellington, with his partner Alf, whom he met through playing rugby together for the Wellington-based Krazy Knights, New Zealand's first gay rugby team. After 10 years in a relationship, they held a civil union ceremony in January 2009.

In his maiden statement (given on 9 December 2008), Robertson alluded to his sexuality as a part, but not the whole, of his identity:

In a 2012 interview with Guyon Espiner, he hit out at the suggestion that being gay could prevent him from understanding the concerns of ordinary New Zealanders:

See also
 Electoral history of Grant Robertson

References

External links

 Robertson's Parliament profile
 Campaign website
 Video clips of speeches given by Robertson in Parliament at inthehouse.co.nz
 Robertson's page on the New Zealand Labour website (includes media statements issued by him)

1971 births
Living people
New Zealand Labour Party MPs
University of Otago alumni
LGBT members of the Parliament of New Zealand
Gay politicians
New Zealand MPs for Wellington electorates
People from Palmerston North
People educated at King's High School, Dunedin
Members of the New Zealand House of Representatives
21st-century New Zealand politicians
Candidates in the 2017 New Zealand general election
Members of the Cabinet of New Zealand
New Zealand finance ministers
Candidates in the 2020 New Zealand general election
Deputy Prime Ministers of New Zealand